Thitarodes richthofeni is a species of moth of the family Hepialidae. It was described by Otto Bang-Haas in 1939, and is known from China.

References

External links
Hepialidae genera

Moths described in 1939
Hepialidae
Taxa named by Otto Bang-Haas